Dame Margaret Taylor Rutherford,  (11 May 1892 – 22 May 1972) was an English actress of stage, television and film.

She came to national attention following World War II in the film adaptations of Noël Coward's Blithe Spirit, and Oscar Wilde's The Importance of Being Earnest. She won an Academy Award and a Golden Globe Award for her role as the Duchess of Brighton in The V.I.P.s (1963). In the early 1960s, she starred as Agatha Christie's character Miss Marple in a series of four George Pollock films. She was appointed an Officer of the Order of the British Empire (OBE) in 1961 and a Dame Commander (DBE) in 1967.

Early life
Rutherford's early life was overshadowed by tragedies involving both of her parents. Her father, journalist and poet William Rutherford Benn, married Florence Nicholson on 16 December 1882 in Wandsworth, South London. One month after the marriage, he suffered a nervous breakdown and was admitted to Bethnal House Lunatic Asylum. Released to travel under his family's supervision, he murdered his father, the Reverend Julius Benn, a Congregational Church minister, by bludgeoning him to death with a chamber pot, before slashing his own throat with a pocket knife at an inn in Matlock, Derbyshire on 4 March 1883.

Following the inquest, William Benn was certified insane and removed to Broadmoor Criminal Lunatic Asylum. Seven years later, on 26 July 1890, he was discharged from Broadmoor and reunited with his wife. He legally dropped his surname.

Margaret Taylor Rutherford, the only child of William and Florence, was born in 1892 in Balham, South London. Margaret's uncle, Sir John Benn, 1st Baronet, was a politician, and her first cousin once removed was the Labour politician Tony Benn. Hoping to start a new life far from the scene of their recent troubles, the Rutherfords emigrated to Madras, India, but Margaret was returned to Britain when she was three years old to live with her aunt Bessie Nicholson in Wimbledon, South London, after her pregnant mother hanged herself from a tree.

Young Margaret had been told that her father died of a broken heart soon afterward. When she was 12 years old, she was shocked to learn that her father had actually been readmitted to Broadmoor Hospital in 1903, where he remained under care until his death on 4 August 1921. Her parents' mental afflictions gave rise to a fear that she might succumb to similar maladies, a fear which haunted her for the rest of her life. She suffered intermittent bouts of depression and anxiety.

Margaret Rutherford was educated at Wimbledon High School (where a theatre space, the Rutherford Centre, is now named after her) and, from the age of about 13, at Raven's Croft School, a boarding school in Sutton Avenue, Seaford. While she was there, she developed an interest in the theatre and performed in amateur dramatics. After she left school, her aunt paid for her to have private acting lessons. When her aunt died, she left a legacy that allowed Rutherford to secure entry to the Old Vic School. In her autobiography, Rutherford called her Aunt Bessie her "adoptive mother and one of the saints of the world".

Stage career
Rutherford, a talented pianist who first found work as a piano teacher and a teacher of elocution, developed an acting career relatively late, only making her stage debut in 1925, aged 33, at the Old Vic. As her "spaniel jowls" and bulky frame made the part of a romantic heroine impossible casting, she soon established her name in comedy, appearing in many of the most successful British plays and films. "I never intended to play for laughs. I am always surprised that the audience thinks me funny at all", Rutherford wrote in her autobiography. Rutherford made her first appearance in London's West End in 1933, but her talent was not recognised by the critics until her performance as Miss Prism in John Gielgud's production of The Importance of Being Earnest at the Globe Theatre in 1939.

In 1941 Noël Coward's Blithe Spirit opened on the London stage at the Piccadilly Theatre, with Coward directing. Rutherford received rave reviews from audiences and critics alike for her lusty portrayal of the bumbling medium Madame Arcati, a role which Coward had envisaged for her. Theatre critic Kenneth Tynan once said of her performances: "The unique thing about Margaret Rutherford is that she can act with her chin alone."
 
Another theatrical success during the war years included her part as the sinister housekeeper Mrs. Danvers in Daphne du Maurier's Rebecca at the Queen's Theatre in 1940. Her post-war theatre credits included Miss Prism in The Importance of Being Earnest again at the Haymarket Theatre in 1946 and Lady Bracknell when the same play transferred to New York City in 1947. She played an officious headmistress in The Happiest Days of Your Life at the Apollo Theatre in 1948 and classical roles such as Madame Desmortes in Ring Round the Moon (Globe Theatre, 1950), Lady Wishfort in The Way of the World (Lyric Hammersmith, 1953 and Saville Theatre, 1956) and Mrs. Candour in The School for Scandal (Haymarket Theatre, 1962). Her final stage performance came in 1966 when she played Mrs. Malaprop in The Rivals at the Haymarket Theatre, alongside Sir Ralph Richardson. Her declining health meant she had to give up the role after a few weeks.

Film career
Although she made her film debut in 1936, it was Rutherford's turn as Madame Arcati in David Lean's film of Blithe Spirit (1945) that established her in films. Her jaunty performance, cycling about the Kent countryside, head held high, back straight, and cape fluttering behind her, established the model for portraying that role thereafter. She was Nurse Carey in Miranda (1948) and the sprightly Medieval expert Professor Hatton-Jones in Passport to Pimlico (1949), one of the Ealing Comedies. She reprised her stage roles of the headmistress alongside Alastair Sim in The Happiest Days of Your Life (1950) and Miss Prism in Anthony Asquith's film adaptation of The Importance of Being Earnest (1952).

More comedies followed, including Castle in the Air (1952) with David Tomlinson, Trouble in Store (1953), with Norman Wisdom, The Runaway Bus (1954) with Frankie Howerd and An Alligator Named Daisy (1955) with Donald Sinden and Diana Dors. Rutherford then worked with Norman Wisdom again in Just My Luck (1957) and co-starred in The Smallest Show on Earth with Virginia McKenna, Peter Sellers and Leslie Phillips (both 1957). She featured, alongside Ian Carmichael and Peter Sellers, in the Boulting Brothers satire I'm All Right Jack (1959).

In the early 1960s, she appeared as Miss Jane Marple in a series of four George Pollock films loosely based on the novels of Agatha Christie. The films depicted Marple as a colourful character, respectable but bossy and eccentric. Authors Marion Shaw and Sabine Vanacker in their book Reflecting on Miss Marple (1991) complained that the emphasis on the "dotty element in the character" missed entirely "the quietness and sharpness" that was admired in the novels. The actress, then aged in her 70s, insisted on wearing her own clothes for the part and having her husband appear alongside her. In 1963 Christie dedicated her novel The Mirror Crack'd from Side to Side "To Margaret Rutherford in admiration", though the novelist too was critical of the films for diverging from her original plots and playing dramatic scenes for laughs. Rutherford reprised the role of Miss Marple in a very brief, uncredited cameo in the 1965 film The Alphabet Murders.

Rutherford played the absent-minded, impoverished, pill-popping Duchess of Brighton, the only comedy relief, in The V.I.P.s (1963), from a screenplay by Terence Rattigan. The film features a star-studded cast led by Maggie Smith, Elizabeth Taylor and Richard Burton. For her performance, she won an Academy Award and Golden Globe Awards for Best Supporting Actress. At the time she set a record for the oldest woman and last born in the nineteenth century to win an Oscar.

She appeared as Mistress Quickly in Orson Welles' film Chimes at Midnight (1965) and was directed by Charlie Chaplin in A Countess from Hong Kong (1967), starring Marlon Brando and Sophia Loren, which was one of her final films. She started work on The Virgin and the Gypsy (1970), but illness caused her to be replaced by Fay Compton.

Personal life, illness and death
In 1945, Rutherford, fifty-three, married character actor Stringer Davis, forty-six, after a courtship that lasted for 15 years. Davis' mother reportedly considered Rutherford an unsuitable match for her son, and their wedding was postponed until after Mrs. Davis had died. Subsequently, the couple appeared in many productions together. Davis adored Rutherford, with one friend noting: "For him she was not only a great talent but, above all, a beauty." The actor and former serviceman rarely left his wife's side, serving Rutherford as private secretary. He also nursed and comforted her through periodic debilitating depression. These illnesses, sometimes involving stays in mental hospitals and electric shock treatment, were kept hidden from the press during Rutherford's lifetime.

In the 1950s, Rutherford and Davis unofficially adopted the writer Dawn Langley Simmons, then in her twenties. She later wrote a biography of Rutherford in 1983.

Rutherford suffered from Alzheimer's disease at the end of her life and was unable to work. Davis cared for his wife at their Buckinghamshire home until her death on 22 May 1972, aged 80. Many of Britain's top actors, including Sir John Gielgud, Sir Ralph Richardson, Dame Flora Robson and Joyce Grenfell, attended a memorial Service of Thanksgiving at the Actors' Church, St. Paul's, Covent Garden, on 21 July 1972, where 90-year-old Dame Sybil Thorndike praised her friend's enormous talent and recalled that Rutherford had "never said anything horrid about anyone".

Rutherford and Davis (who died in 1973) are interred at the graveyard of St. James's Church, Gerrards Cross, Buckinghamshire. "A Blithe Spirit" is inscribed on the base of Margaret Rutherford's memorial stone, a reference to the Noël Coward play that helped to make her name.

Theatre performances
A student at the Old Vic Theatre School, playing walk-ons and small parts in various shows, 1925–26
Understudy for Mabel Terry-Lewis at the Lyric Theatre, Hammersmith, 1928
A season with the English Repertory Players at the Grand Theatre, Fulham, 1929
Little Theatre, Epsom, 1930
A season in rep at the Oxford Playhouse, 1930–31
A season in rep in Croydon, 1931
A season with the Greater London Players, 1932
Mrs. Read in Wild Justice at the Lyric Theatre, Hammersmith, 1933
Birthday (understudy to Jean Cadell and Muriel Aked), at the Cambridge Theatre, 1934
Aline Solness in The Master Builder at the Embassy Theatre, Swiss Cottage, 1934
Lady Nancy in Hervey House at His Majesty's Theatre, 1935
Miss Flower in Short Story at the Queen's Theatre, 1935
Mrs. Palmai in Farewell Performance at the Lyric Theatre, Hammersmith, 1936
Aunt Bella in Tavern in the Town at the Embassy Theatre, Swiss Cottage, 1937
Emily Deveral in Up the Garden Path at the Embassy Theatre, Swiss Cottage, 1937
The Mother in The Melody That Got Lost at the Phoenix Theatre, 1938
Bijou Furze in Spring Meeting at the Ambassadors Theatre, 1938
Miss Prism in The Importance of Being Earnest at the Globe Theatre, 1939
Mrs. Danvers in Rebecca at the Queen's Theatre, 1940
Madame Arcati in Blithe Spirit at the Piccadilly Theatre, 1941
ENSA tour of France and Belgium, 1944
Queen of Hearts and White Queen in Alice in Wonderland at the Palace Theatre, 1944
Lady Charlotte Fayre in Perchance to Dream at the London Hippodrome, 1945
Miss Prism in The Importance of Being Earnest at the Theatre Royal Haymarket, 1946
Lady Bracknell in The Importance of Being Earnest at the Royale Theatre, New York, 1947
Evelyn Whitchurch in The Happiest Days of Your Life at the Apollo Theatre, 1948
Madame Desmortes in Ring Round the Moon at the Globe Theatre, 1950
The title role in Miss Hargreaves at the Royal Court Theatre and New Theatre, 1952
Lady Wishfort in The Way of the World at the Lyric Theatre, Hammersmith, 1953
White Queen in Alice Through the Looking-Glass at the Prince's Theatre, 1954
Duchess of Pont-au-Bronc in Time Remembered at the Lyric Theatre, Hammersmith and New Theatre, 1954
Mirabelle Petersham in A Likely Tale at the Globe Theatre, 1956
Lady Wishfort in The Way of the World at the Saville Theatre, 1956
Lady Bracknell in The Importance of Being Earnest on Ireland and UK tour (Dublin, Limerick, Belfast, Edinburgh, Leeds, Liverpool, Eastbourne and Bournemouth), 1957
The Happiest Days of Your Life and Time Remembered on tour of Australia, 1957
Minerva Goody (Povis) in Farewell, Farewell Eugene at the Garrick Theatre, 1959
Minerva Goody (Povis) in Farewell, Farewell Eugene at the Helen Hayes Theatre, New York, 1960
Bijou Furze in Dazzling Prospect at the Globe Theatre, 1961
The Marquise in Our Little Life at the Manoel Theatre in Valletta, Malta and the Pembroke Theatre, Croydon, 1961
Mrs. Candour in The School for Scandal at the Theatre Royal Haymarket, 1962
Mrs. Laura Partridge in The Solid Gold Cadillac at the Saville Theatre, 1965
Mrs. Heidelberg in The Clandestine Marriage at the Chichester Festival Theatre, 1966
Mrs. Malaprop in The Rivals at the Theatre Royal Haymarket, 1966

Filmography

Legacy
For One Night Only: Margaret Rutherford. Margaret Rutherford (Timothy Spall in drag) tells her life story in cabaret form before an audience. Without Walls TV Series (UK) 5 October 1993.

Recordings
The English PEN International Centre included several readings of poems by Rutherford on a list entitled Library of Recordings.pdf  (1953). The works listed were:
"A Charm Against the Toothache" by John Heath-Stubbs
"O Country People" by John Hewett
"Sedge-Warblers", "Women He Liked", "Haymaking", "Adlestrop", "Will You Come?" and "Lights Out" by Edward Thomas

78s and singles
All's Going Well / Nymphs and Shepherds (1953) (with Frankie Howerd): Philips Records PB214

References

Further reading

External links

Margaret Rutherford at the British Film Institute

Oxford National Dictionary of Biography profile
Performances in Theatre Archive, University of Bristol
"Famous Rutherfords"
 

1892 births
1972 deaths
Alumni of RADA
Audiobook narrators
Best Supporting Actress Academy Award winners
Best Supporting Actress Golden Globe (film) winners
English film actresses
English stage actresses
English voice actresses
Dames Commander of the Order of the British Empire
Deaths from Alzheimer's disease
Neurological disease deaths in England
Actresses awarded damehoods
People from Balham
People from Buckinghamshire
People educated at Wimbledon High School
Actresses from London
20th-century English actresses
Benn family
British comedy actresses
English autobiographers